is a private Junior College in the city of Suzuka, Mie, Japan. It was established in 1966 as women's college. It became coeducation in 1987. The college is located on the same campus as Suzuka International University.

External links
 Suzuka Junior College

Educational institutions established in 1966
Private universities and colleges in Japan
Japanese junior colleges
Universities and colleges in Mie Prefecture
1966 establishments in Japan